Benjamin Freeman may refer to:

Ben Freeman (born 1980), British actor, best known for his role in Emmerdale
Benjamin Green Freeman, Liberian politician

See also
Benjamin H. Freedman (1890–1984), American businessman and activist
Benjamin Friedman (disambiguation)